Cosmic Slop is the fifth studio album by Funkadelic, released in May 1973 on Westbound Records. While it has been favorably reevaluated by critics long after its original release, the album was a commercial failure, producing no charting singles, and reaching only #112 on the Billboard pop chart and #21 on the R&B chart.

Cosmic Slop is the first Funkadelic album to feature artwork and liner notes by Pedro Bell, who assumed responsibility for the band's gate-fold album covers and liner notes until the band's collapse after 1981's The Electric Spanking of War Babies. Bell's liner notes to Cosmic Slop include small illustrations next to each song's name, summarizing the song in a picture.

Track listing

Side One
 “Nappy Dugout” (George Clinton, Cordell Mosson, Garry Shider) – 4:33
 “You Can’t Miss What You Can’t Measure” (Clinton, Sidney Barnes) – 3:03
 “March to the Witch’s Castle” (Clinton) – 5:59
 “Let’s Make It Last” (Clinton, Eddie Hazel) – 4:08

Side Two
 “Cosmic Slop” (Clinton, Bernie Worrell) (released as a single-Westbound 218) – 5:17
 “No Compute” (Clinton, Shider) – 3:03
 “This Broken Heart” (William Franklin) – 3:37
 “Trash a Go-Go” (Clinton) – 2:25
 “Can’t Stand the Strain” (Clinton, Hazel) – 3:27

Personnel 

 Bernard Worrell - keyboards, melodica, strings on "Broken Heart"
 "Boogie" Mosson - bass guitar
 Tyrone Lampkin - percussion
 Garry Shider - lead & rhythm guitar
 Ron Bykowski - lead & rhythm guitar
 Tiki Fulwood - drums on "Nappy Dugout"
 Parlet members Mallia Franklin and Debbie Wright - vocals (uncredited)
 Engineers: Lee De Carlo, Manta Sound, Toronto

Songs

You Can’t Miss What You Can’t Measure 
This song is a reworking of the 1965 Parliaments single "Heart Trouble". The instrumental portion of this song was reworked into "Do That Stuff" for the 1976 album The Clones of Dr. Funkenstein.

 Lead Vocals: George Clinton, Ray Davis, Garry Shider

Cosmic Slop 

 Lead Vocals: Garry Shider
 Guitars: Garry Shider & Ron Bykowski
 Drums: Tyrone Lampkin
 Bass: Cordell Boogie Mosson

This track was remade several times by future lineups of Parliament/Funkadelic. A live version (recorded during a rehearsal) appears on the 1976 Funkadelic album Hardcore Jollies. Several Parliament/Funkadelic members contributed to a full cover of the track for Bill Laswell’s Axiom Funk project, released on the 1995 album Funkcronomicon.

Another live version, from 1983 and released in 1990 on Live at the Beverly Theater, features Dennis Chambers on drums, Rodney Curtis on bass, and Eddie Hazel, Garry Shider, and Michael Hampton on guitar.

No Compute 

 Lead Vocals: George Clinton

This Broken Heart 

 Strings: Bernie Worrell
 Lead Vocals: Ben Edwards
 Drums: Geezer McGee (disputed)

Cosmic Slop Compilation 
In 2000, Castle Music released a 10-track compilation album, also called "Cosmic Slop" - although it bore no relation to the studio album of the same name. The album's tracklisting consisted of: "One Nation Under A Groove", "Comin" Round The Mountain", "Cholly (Funk Getting Ready To Roll!)", "Freak Of The Week", "Uncle Jam", "Groovallegiance", "Smokey", “Cosmic Slop", "Soul Mate" and "(Medley) Funk Gets Stronger (Killer Millimeter Longer Version)/ She Loves You". The album was subtitled "Original Recordings From The Masters Of Funk!"

See also 
 The Space Traders

References 

 

Funkadelic albums
Westbound Records albums
1973 albums
Albums with cover art by Pedro Bell